Kandi's Wedding is an American reality documentary television series that premiered on Bravo on June 1, 2014. Developed as a spin-off from The Real Housewives of Atlanta.

The five-part wedding series follows singer and reality television star Kandi Burruss and her husband Todd Tucker as they prepare for their wedding ceremony.

The series is the fourth out of five spin-offs of The Real Housewives of Atlanta, to feature Burruss.

Background 
Bravo announced Burruss and Tucker's wedding spin-off, Kandi's Wedding, on April 8, 2014. The sneak peek of the wedding special was released on April 29, 2014, and the show premiered on June 1, 2014. The series consisted of five episodes and concluded on July 6, 2014. This is the fourth spin-off of The Real Housewives of Atlanta and the second one starring Burruss, the other show being called The Kandi Factory which debuted on April 9, 2013 and was cancelled after one season.

Kandi Burruss and Todd Tucker got married at Le Fais Do-Do event facility in Atlanta, Georgia on April 4, 2014. Burruss' bridesmaids included matron of honor former Xscape member Tamera Wynn, maid of honor Carmon Cambrice, Xscape member and rapper T.I.’s wife Tameka "Tiny" Harris, Joyce Dallas, Fantasia Barrino, Love & Hip Hop: Atlanta cast member Rasheeda Frost, and The Real Housewives of Atlanta star Phaedra Parks. Other attendees included The Real Housewives of Atlanta co-stars Lisa Wu, Sheree Whitfield, and Cynthia Bailey.

Each episode follows Kandi and Todd as they plan their lavish Eddie Murphy's Coming to America-themed wedding ceremony.
The couple have decided to get married against vocal family opposition that played out during the sixth season of The Real Housewives of Atlanta, the show that they both star in. The couple decided that they would be able to pull off their wedding in five weeks without the help of a wedding planner. The newlyweds encountered with other major problems, including Kandi's mother Mama Joyce who was not very supportive of their wedding and has always felt very negative towards Todd, a man she repeatedly accused of being a "opportunist." Todd and Kandi also got into an argument because of the prenuptial agreement as Todd was not sure whether signing it would be a good idea—just one day before the wedding.

Kandi's Wedding is the highest-rated offshoot of The Real Housewives of Atlanta yet; the show brought in high ratings for Bravo, surpassing previous spin-offs starring NeNe Leakes and Kim Zolciak.

Episodes

References

External links 

 
 

2010s American reality television series
2014 American television series debuts
2014 American television series endings
English-language television shows
Bravo (American TV network) original programming
Wedding television shows
The Real Housewives spin-offs
Television shows set in Atlanta
American television spin-offs
Reality television spin-offs